The crafty vesper mouse (Calomys callidus) is a species of rodent in the family Cricetidae.
It is found in Argentina and Paraguay.

References

Musser, G. G. and M. D. Carleton. 2005. Superfamily Muroidea. pp. 894–1531 in Mammal Species of the World a Taxonomic and Geographic Reference. D. E. Wilson and D. M. Reeder eds. Johns Hopkins University Press, Baltimore.

Calomys
Mammals of Argentina
Mammals of Paraguay
Mammals described in 1916
Taxa named by Oldfield Thomas
Taxonomy articles created by Polbot